Kuchek Dig Seyyed (also Romanized as Kūchek Dīg Seyyed; also known as Kūchek Dīgī Seyyed, Kūchek Rīgī Seyyed, and Kūchek Seyyed) is a village in Bagheli-ye Marama Rural District, in the Central District of Gonbad-e Qabus County, Golestan Province, Iran. At the 2006 census, its population was 612, in 136 families.

References 

Populated places in Gonbad-e Kavus County